The 1968 European Wrestling Championships were held in the Greco-Romane style and  in Västerås 14 – 16 June 1968; the men's Freestyle style  in Skopje 02 – 04 July 1968.

Medal table

Medal summary

Men's freestyle

Men's Greco-Roman

References

External links
Fila's official championship website

Europe
W
W
European Wrestling Championships
Euro
Sports competitions in Skopje
Sports competitions in Västerås
1968 in European sport